Marcelo de Souza Ramos (born 25 February 1978), commonly known as Marcelinho, is a Brazilian former football offensive midfielder who played in Brazil, Ecuador and Mexico.

Career
Born in Jundiaí do Sul, Marcelinho played for Santo André, Clube Atlético Paranaense and Figueirense, all of his native Brazil. He joined Necaxa in the Primera División de México for the 2004 Apertura. With Necaxa, Mercelinho saw little time, starting in one game and appearing as a substitute in five more, while scoring no goals. In July 2005, he joined Ecuadorian Serie A side Olmedo.

References

External links
 Profile at BDFA 
 Marcelo de Ramos official website

1978 births
Living people
Brazilian footballers
Brazilian expatriate footballers
Liga MX players
Esporte Clube Santo André players
Club Necaxa footballers
Club Athletico Paranaense players
Figueirense FC players
C.D. Olmedo footballers
Expatriate footballers in Mexico
Association football midfielders
Sportspeople from Paraná (state)